Parliamentary elections were held in Rwanda on 3 September 2018, with Rwandan overseas voting the day before. The result was a victory for the Rwandan Patriotic Front coalition, which won 40 of the 53 elected seats while losing its absolute majority over the total of seats, whilst the Democratic Green Party and Social Party Imberakuri both entered parliament for the first time. With 49 of the 80 seats in the newly elected parliament held by women (61%), the elections maintained Rwanda's position as the country with the highest proportion of female MPs.

Electoral system
The 80-seat Chamber of Deputies is elected by two methods: 53 seats are directly elected by closed list proportional representation in a single nationwide constituency with an electoral threshold of 5%; seats are allocated using the largest remainder method. The remaining 27 seats are indirectly elected by local and national councils, including 24 reserved for women (six from Eastern, Southern and Western provinces, four from Northern Province and two from Kigali), two for representatives of youth and one for representatives of the disabled.

Results
Ernest Kamanzi and Clarisse Imaniriho were elected as the youth representatives, whilst Eugene Mussolini was elected as the disabled representative.

References

Elections in Rwanda
Rwanda
2018 in Rwanda